John Manwood (by 1524 – c. 1571), of Sandwich, Kent was an English Member of Parliament for Sandwich in 1571 and Mayor of Sandwich in 1555–6 and 1559–60.

References

1571 deaths
People from Sandwich, Kent
Mayors of places in Kent
English MPs 1555
English MPs 1559
Year of birth uncertain